Uhlorchestia is a genus of beach hoppers in the family Talitridae. There are at least two described species in Uhlorchestia.

Species
These two species belong to the genus Uhlorchestia:
 Uhlorchestia spartinophila Bousfield & Heard, 1986
 Uhlorchestia uhleri (Shoemaker, 1930)

References

Further reading

 
 
 

Amphipoda
Articles created by Qbugbot